Nashib (also Romanized as Nashīb; also known as Nashīb-e ‘Olyā) is a village in Yam Rural District, Meshkan District, Khoshab County, Razavi Khorasan Province, Iran. At the 2006 census, its population was 308, in 80 families.

References 

Populated places in Khoshab County